"Low" is a song by American rock band Cracker. It appears on their 1993 album, Kerosene Hat. "Low", a sleeper hit, reached number 64 on the US Billboard Hot 100 chart in May 1994. The song's biggest success was on the rock charts, reaching number three on the Billboard Modern Rock Tracks chart in November 1993 and number five on the Billboard Album Rock Tracks chart in March 1994. The music video, directed by Carlos Grasso, portrays Lowery badly losing a boxing match with actress/comedian Sandra Bernhard.

Lead singer David Lowery has said that the band's label made him write a letter to radio stations denying that the song was about drugs, claiming that the repeated phrase "being stoned" was really "being stone." Lowery paraphrased a label executive as telling him, "I don't believe you and neither will anyone else, but there needs to be deniability and this is what we're gonna say."

The song was featured in the film The Perks of Being a Wallflower and its accompanying soundtrack in addition to The Wolverine and an episode of Hindsight and Rectify. B-side track "Whole Lotta Trouble" was featured on the soundtrack of the 1995 film Empire Records.

In 2013, Lowery posted an essay on his Trichordist site focused on "Low" in the era of streaming music. The headline was "My Song Got Played on Pandora 1 Million Times and All I Got Was $16.89, Less Than What I Make From a Single T-Shirt Sale!" The post went viral and continues to be a reference point in the debate over the economics of streaming music.

Track listings
UK CD single
"Low" – 4:36
"I Ride My Bike" – 6:32
"Sunday Train" – 3:42
"Whole Lotta Trouble" – 2:26

US CD single
"Low" – 4:35
"Sunday Train" – 3:42
"Whole Lotta Trouble" – 2:26
"I See The Light" – 5:13
"Steve's Hornpipe" – 2:13

Charts

Release history

Cover versions
In 2017, Lydia Lunch and Cypress Grove covered the song on their album Under the Covers.

References

1993 singles
1993 songs
Black-and-white music videos
Cracker (band) songs
Virgin Records singles